ProCivitas Private Gymnasium is a Swedish upper secondary school, offering courses in studies of society and science, and Economy and law. The school is known in Sweden for being an elite school, where the school in Helsingborg and Malmö has among the highest enrolment points among all Sweden's upper secondary schools. Every year, several ProCivitas alumni enrolls at high-performing universities, such as Harvard, Cambridge and Oxford.

Courses
Helsingborg: Studies of economy, society, and natural science.

Malmö: Studies of society, economy, sports focus, and natural science.

Växjö: Studies of society, sports focus, and natural science.

Lund: Studies of society, economy, and natural science.

Stockholm: Studies of Society, Economics, and Economics combined with law.

Stockholm Karlberg: Studies of Society and Natural science.

External links
Webpage of ProCivitas Private Gymnasium (in Swedish)

References
Webpage of ProCivitas Private Gymnasium (in Swedish) 

Webpage of Junior Enterprise Sweden (in Swedish) 
 https://archive.today/20130418141906/http://www.procivitas.se/helsingborg/nyheter/nya-alumnis-pa-harvard-princeton-oxford-cass-warwick-och-lite-mer/

Helsingborgs Dagblad (newspaper): article concerning the top grades of ProCivitas students (in Swedish) 

Expressen (newspaper): Gymnasieskolorna i Sverige som är svårast att komma in på (in Swedish)

Schools in Sweden